K. Sint-Truidense VV Vrouwen is a Belgian women's football club representing K. Sint-Truidense VV in the Belgian First Division.

Originally established in 1983 as FCL Rapide Wezemaal, it was absorbed by Sint-Truidense in 2008, moving from Wezemaal, Rotselaar to Sint-Truiden. The team enjoyed its most successful period so far between 2004 and 2008, winning four championships in a row (including two doubles) and reaching the 2008 European Cup quarterfinals. In 2010 it won its first championship as Sint-Truidense.

The team won the Belgian championship in 2004, 2005, 2006 and 2007, thereby qualifying for the UEFA Women's Cup. After only reaching the first qualifying round in the Women'S Cups 2004-05 and 2005–06, the team reached the second qualifying round in the next season and in 2007-08 went all the way to the quarter finals.

Titles
 5 Belgian Leagues (2004 — 2007, 2010)
 6 Belgian Cups (1993, 1997, 2001, 2003, 2004, 2007)
 1 Belgian Supercup (2006)

Record in UEFA competitions

References

External links
 UEFA.com club page

Sint-Truiden
Association football clubs established in 1983
Association football clubs disestablished in 2015
BeNe League teams
Women
Sport in Limburg (Belgium)
1983 establishments in Belgium
2015 disestablishments in Belgium